Holmon Wiggins (born June 2, 1980)  is an American football coach who was the assistant head coach of offense and wide receivers coach for the Alabama Crimson Tide.

Early life
Wiggins played high school football at San Pedro High School and was the city's Class 4A Player of the Year.

Playing career
Wiggins was a four-year letterwinner and three-year starting running back at the University of New Mexico and holds the school records for single-season punt returns (46) and punt return yards (392).

Coaching career

New Mexico
Wiggins began his career as a student assistant at New Mexico from 2003 to 2004 before becoming a graduate assistant in 2005.

Illinois State
In 2006, he joined Illinois State as the running backs coach. He remained there until after the 2010 season.

Tulsa
In 2011, he joined Tulsa and spent a single year as the team's running backs coach.

Memphis
In 2012, he reunited with Justin Fuente at Memphis as their wide receivers coach.

Virginia Tech
In 2016, Wiggins followed Justin Fuente to Virginia Tech as their wide receivers coach. While coaching the Hokies’ wide receivers for three years, he helped Cam Phillips establish himself as Virginia Tech’s career leader in receptions and receiving yards.

Alabama
In 2019, Wiggins became the Alabama wide receivers coach under Nick Saban.

In 2020 in addition to winning  the national championship, DeVonta Smith won the Heisman Trophy whilst under Wiggins. He was the first wide receiver to win the award since Desmond Howard in 1991, and only the fourth overall.

In 2021, he was promoted to assistant head coach of offense in addition to wide receivers coach.

References

Further reading

1980 births
21st-century African-American sportspeople
Living people
African-American coaches of American football
African-American players of American football
New Mexico Lobos football players
American football running backs
Players of American football from Los Angeles
Coaches of American football from California
New Mexico Lobos football coaches
Illinois State Redbirds football coaches
Tulsa Golden Hurricane football coaches
Memphis Tigers football coaches
Virginia Tech Hokies football coaches
Alabama Crimson Tide football coaches
20th-century African-American people